Doris falklandica is a species of sea slug, a dorid nudibranch, a marine gastropod mollusc in the family Dorididae.

Distribution
This species was described from one specimen collected by Mr Valentine in the Falkland Islands.

References

Dorididae
Gastropods described in 1907